Mats Rosenkranz (born 23 August 1998) is a German tennis player.

Rosenkranz has a career high ATP singles ranking of world No. 343, achieved on 9 May 2022, and a career high doubles ranking of No. 463, achieved on 19 August 2019.

Professional career

2022: Challenger final, first top-25 win as Mallorca qualifier 
In January 2022, Rosenkranz won his first challenger title, defeating Matías Franco Descotte and Facundo Díaz Acosta at the 2022 Challenger de Tigre, partnering with Conner Huertas del Pino.

In the first-round qualifying match for the Mallorca Open, Rosenkranz scored his biggest win against world number 25 Nikoloz Basilashvili in straight sets. He lost in the second qualifying round to Antoine Bellier.

ATP Challenger and Futures/World Tennis Tour finals

Singles: 4 (3–1)

Doubles (8 titles, 5 runner-up)

References

External links
 
 

1998 births
Living people
German male tennis players
Sportspeople from Essen
Tennis people from North Rhine-Westphalia